Club de Regatas Corrientes, usually just Regatas Corrientes, is a sports club of Corrientes, Argentina, located on the river side of the Paraná river. Although Regatas was born as a rowing institution, the club is mostly recognized due to its basketball team, which plays in the Liga Nacional de Básquet (Argentine first division). Its home stadium is the Estadio José Jorge Conte, that holds 5,000 people.

Apart from basketball, the club hosts a large variety of sports such as rowing, association football, cestoball, chess, gymnastics, judo, karate, swimming, table tennis, taekwondo, volleyball and weight lifting.

History
The club was founded on September 27, 1923, by a group of enthusiastic rowers and swimmers. The first president was Dr. José Chapo. At the beginning, the Regatas had few members and a large beach over the Río Paraná coast. The institution was expanding itself developing activities such as rowing, swimming and sailing ship.

Some of the most relevants sailors of that time were Antonio Leconte, the Miholvisevich Brothers, Fages and Ismael Condado, all of them representing Regatas in diverse competitions. Other clubs that also participated were Club de Regatas de Resistencia (Chaco), Club Náutico de Formosa (Formosa), Náutico de Monte Caseros (Corrientes), Náutico de Eldorado (Misiones), Rowing Club de Posadas and the Paraguayan clubs Deportivo de Puerto Sajonia and Mbigua.

During the 70's, Regatas incorporated a lot of new members, who came attracted by its beach where they could spend long periods of time during Summertime. The club received also funds from the Government used to build a roofed stadium, Estadio José Jorge Conte, which was able for the practice of basketball and volleyball and had a capacity of 2,600 seats.

In 2008, Regatas won the Liga Sudamericana defeating Flamengo 3–2 (in matches won) in the final.

Players

Current roster

Notable players 

  Nicolas Brussino (2012–2015)
 Ægir Steinarsson (2019)

Honours

National
Liga Nacional de Básquet (1):: 2012–13
Copa Argentina de Básquet (1):: 2007

International
Liga Sudamericana (2):: 2008, 2012
FIBA Americas League (1):: 2010–11

References

External links
 Official website 

Basketball teams in Argentina
Basketball teams established in 1923
Rowing clubs in Argentina